Chraštice is a municipality and village in Příbram District in the Central Bohemian Region of the Czech Republic. It has about 300 inhabitants.

Administrative parts
The village of Chraštičky is an administrative part of Chraštice.

Geography
It lies in the Benešov Uplands. There are three ponds in the municipal territory.

History

The first written mention of Chraštice is from 1260.

Transport
The I/4 road, which replaces that unfinished section of the D4 motorway from Prague to Písek, passes through the municipality.

Sights
The landmark of Chraštice is the Church of the Assumption of the Virgin Mary. It is a valuable early Gothic church from the 13th century, which was partly rebuilt in the Baroque style and extended into its current form in 1723–1724.

A historically valuable building is the former fortress from the 14th century, later rebuilt into an inn.

References

External links

Villages in Příbram District